Joseph Noteboom (born June 19, 1995) is an American football offensive tackle for the Los Angeles Rams of the National Football League (NFL). He played college football at TCU.

Early life and career
Noteboom was born in Plano, Texas. He attended Plano Senior High School, where he played football and ice hockey.  He verbally committed to Texas Christian University in the summer before his senior year at Plano, during which he earned All-District honors for the Wildcats.

At TCU, Noteboom redshirted in his first season on campus in Fort Worth and played in 13 games as a reserve in 2014. He became the Horned Frogs' starting right tackle as a sophomore in 2015 before shifting to left tackle for his junior and senior seasons.  His final collegiate game, his 40th consecutive start, was a win over Stanford in the 2017 Alamo Bowl.

Professional career
On January 4, 2018, it was announced that Noteboom had accepted his invitation to play in the Senior Bowl. He impressed scouts and analysts by showcasing his versatility and athleticism during Senior Bowl practices which helped raise his draft stock. On January 27, 2018, Noteboom played in the 2018 Reese's Senior Bowl and was part of Houston Texans' head coach Bill O'Brien's South team that defeated Denver Broncos' head coach Vance Joseph's North team 45–16. Noteboom attended the NFL Scouting Combine in Indianapolis and completed all of the combine and positional drills. His combine performance was widely considered a success among scouts due to his 40-yard dash time and displays of agility.

On March 30, 2018, Noteboom participated at TCU's pro day, but opted to stand on his combine numbers and only performed positional drills. He attended private visits and workouts with the Los Angeles Rams and Kansas City Chiefs. At the conclusion of the pre-draft process, Noteboom was projected to be a third round pick by NFL draft experts and scouts. He was ranked as the seventh best offensive tackle in the draft by Scouts Inc., was ranked the eighth best offensive tackle by DraftScout.com, and was ranked the 12th best offensive tackle in the draft by Sports Illustrated.

The Los Angeles Rams selected Noteboom in the third round (89th overall) of the 2018 NFL Draft. Noteboom was the tenth offensive tackle drafted in 2018.

On June 9, 2018, the Los Angeles Rams signed Noteboom to a four-year, $3.45 million contract that includes a signing bonus of $818,892.

After spending his rookie year as a backup, Noteboom was named the starting left guard to begin the 2019 season. He started the first six games before suffering a knee injury in Week 6. It was revealed that he suffered a torn ACL and MCL and was placed on season-ending injured reserve on October 15, 2019.

Noteboom entered 2020 as the Rams' starting left guard. He was placed on injured reserve on September 24, 2020, with a calf injury. He was activated on November 14, 2020.

In 2021, Noteboom won Super Bowl LVI when the Rams defeated the Cincinnati Bengals 23-20.

On March 14, 2022, Noteboom signed a three-year, $40 million contract extension with the Rams. He was placed on injured reserve on October 18, 2022 after suffering a torn Achilles in Week 6.

References

External links
TCU Horned Frogs profile
Los Angeles Rams bio

1995 births
Living people
American football offensive guards
TCU Horned Frogs football players
Sportspeople from Plano, Texas
Los Angeles Rams players
Players of American football from Texas